Szczuczyn  is a town in Grajewo County, Podlaskie Voivodeship, Poland. As of 2004, it has a population of 3,602.

History

The town is located in the north-eastern outskirts of Mazovia, which has been part of Poland since the establishment of the state in the Middle Ages. In 1437, the Szczuka noble family of the Grabie coat of arms purchased the land, on which they founded the village, which was initially named Szczuki-Litwa. Thanks to the efforts of Stanisław Antoni Szczuka, Szczuczyn was granted town rights around 1690 by Polish King John III Sobieski. Szczuka brought the Piarists to the town and a Baroque Piarist church and monastery complex was built, which remains the greatest landmark of the town. Szczuka also built a Piarist college, for which the Polish King established a scholarship fund. Szczuczyn was a private town, administratively located in the Masovian Voivodeship in the Greater Poland Province of the Polish Crown. Stanisław Antoni Szczuka, who died in Warsaw in 1710, was buried in the local Piarist church. In the 18th century the town passed to the powerful Potocki family. Factors that largely contributed to the development of the town were the presence of the school and the location on a trade route connecting Białystok and Königsberg.

In the Third Partition of Poland, in 1795, it was annexed by Prussia, in 1807 it became part of the newly established, although short-lived, Polish Duchy of Warsaw, and in 1815 it passed to the Russian Partition of Poland. Afterwards it saw a significant influx of Jews from Russia as a result of Russian discriminatory regulations and persecution (see Pale of Settlement). Szczuczyn was one of the sites of Russian executions of Polish insurgents during the January Uprising. On May 15, 1864, one of the last battles of the January Uprising was fought there. During World War I, the town was occupied by Germany, and after the war it became part of Poland when the country regained independence in 1918.

World War II

Some 56% of the town's 4,502 inhabitants were Jews prior to World War II. During the invasion of Poland, which started World War II, it was captured and briefly occupied by German forces. On September 12-13, 1939, Einsatzgruppe V entered the town to commit various crimes against the population. Germans sent 350 men, mostly Jewish, to forced labor, of whom only 30 returned after five months. The town was then turned over to the Soviets, who arrested the wealthy residents of the town, including many Jews. Some twenty Jewish families were expelled to Siberia on 21 June 1941 and approximately 2,000 Jews remained in the town. In 1941 the local Polish underground resistance movement was weakened when the Soviets arrested its commander. In June 1941, some 300 Jews were killed in a massacre carried out by the Polish inhabitants of Szczuczyn after the town was bypassed by the invading German soldiers in the beginning of Operation Barbarossa. The June massacre was stopped by German soldiers. A subsequent massacre by Poles in July killed some 100 Jews, and following the German Gestapo takeover in August 1941 some 600 Jews were killed by the Germans, the remaining Jews placed in a ghetto, and subsequently sent to Treblinka extermination camp.

Sports
It competes in the lower leagues.

Notable residents
Stanisław Antoni Szczuka is buried there.

 Fania Bergstein (1908–1950), Hebrew-language poet
  (born 1966), Polish opera singer
 Maciej Makuszewski (born 1989), Polish footballer
 Myer Prinstein (1878–1925), Jewish American track and field athlete, three-time Olympic gold medal winner
 Chaim-Dovid Romerowski (1898-1942), Rabbi in the city of Szczuczyn
 Bohdan Winiarski (1884–1969), Polish jurist, professor and former President of the International Court of Justice

References

External links
Official town webpage
Jewish community of Szczuczyn
From the Inferno Back to Life (Szczuczyn, Poland)- Written by Itzhak Wertman z”l
  

Cities and towns in Podlaskie Voivodeship
Grajewo County
Masovian Voivodeship (1526–1795)
Łomża Governorate
Białystok Voivodeship (1919–1939)
Belastok Region
Holocaust locations in Poland